The Newburgh Sting is a 2014 documentary film about the Federal Bureau of Investigation's sting operation on four Muslim men involved in the 2009 Bronx terrorism plot. Beginning in 2008, an FBI informant, Shaheed Hussain, recorded hours of conversations with the men who were ultimately arrested and convicted of planting three non-functional bombs next to two synagogues in Riverdale, Bronx and for planning to use Stinger missiles to shoot down United States military cargo planes near Newburgh, New York. The documentary shows that the four men were coaxed into participating in the plot by an FBI informant  and offered incentives including $250,000. The men's lawyers, including Sam Braverman, who is featured prominently in the film, argue that this was a case of entrapment. Also featured in the film is Michael German, a former undercover FBI agent and a current fellow in the Brennan Center for Justice's Liberty and National Security program.

Awards

The film was shown at the Tribeca Film Festival. It won a Peabody Award and a Founder's Prize special award at the Traverse City Film Festival.

References

External links
HBO Documentary Films

2014 films
Documentary films about terrorism
Islamic terrorism in New York (state)
Documentary films about law enforcement in the United States
American documentary films
2014 documentary films
2010s English-language films
Films directed by David Heilbroner
Films directed by Kate Davis
2010s American films